is a female field hockey player from Japan. She twice represented her native country at the Summer Olympics (2004 and 2008). During the 2004 summer Olympics she helped Japan reach 8th Place, and in the 2008 Summer Olympics she helped her country finish in 10th position.

Komori became top scorer at the 2006 Women's Hockey World Cup Qualifier in Rome, Italy, alongside Kaori Chiba (Japan), Rhona Simpson (Scotland) and Maryna Vynohradova (Ukraine), scoring six goals.

References

External links
 
 sports-reference

1983 births
Living people
Japanese female field hockey players
Field hockey players at the 2004 Summer Olympics
Field hockey players at the 2008 Summer Olympics
Olympic field hockey players of Japan
Sportspeople from Tochigi Prefecture
Asian Games medalists in field hockey
Field hockey players at the 2006 Asian Games
Asian Games silver medalists for Japan
Medalists at the 2006 Asian Games
21st-century Japanese women